Kutxabank is a Spanish bank founded and based in Bilbao. It was officially created on 1 January 2012 out of the merger of three Basque financial institutions operating in their respective provinces: Bilbao Bizkaia Kutxa (BBK), based in Bilbao; Gipuzkoa Donostia Kutxa (Kutxa), based in San Sebastián; and Caja Vital Kutxa (Vital) based in Vitoria.

Required by the Spanish Government's bank merger deadline, all three institutions ceased to exist as savings banks after a long period of internal deliberation and integration.

Kutxabank operates in Andalusia and Extremadura with the brand CajaSur.

History
The European stress test measuring solvency in periods of credit crisis showed that Kutxabank ranked first in Spain, standing out as the soundest financial institution (data published in October 2014). A report issued by the European Bank Authority in December 2020 considered Kutxabank the most solvent bank in Spain, also ranking higher than the European average.

External links
 Official Website

See also
 List of banks in Spain

References

Banks of Spain
Basque companies
Banks established in 2012
Banks under direct supervision of the European Central Bank
Organisations based in Bilbao
2012 establishments in the Basque Country (autonomous community)